BBC Radio Cumbria is the BBC's local radio station serving the county of Cumbria. It broadcasts on FM, AM, DAB, digital TV and via BBC Sounds from studios in Carlisle.

According to RAJAR, the station has a weekly audience of 82,000 listeners and a 8.2% share as of December 2022.

History
The county of Cumbria, from which the station takes its current name, was not created until 1974. Radio Cumbria began service on 24 November 1973 as BBC Radio Carlisle and could be received across most of the former county of Cumberland.

The station adopted its current name shortly before its tenth anniversary in May 1982, when its service was expanded to cover the whole of the administrative county of Cumbria, namely:
 The former counties of Cumberland and Westmorland
 The former exclave of Lancashire "North of the Sands"
 The small area of the former West Riding of Yorkshire, around Sedbergh and Dent, that had been moved from Yorkshire into Cumbria.

BBC Radio Furness opt-out
From the launch of the renamed station, between 25 May 1982 and 1991, an opt-out service, BBC Radio Furness operated in the south of the county at peak times – originally breakfast and lunchtimes on weekdays, and Saturday mornings. Programmes were produced in Barrow-in-Furness and used 96.1 MHz and 837 kHz. This meant that, in addition to the Furness area, Radio Furness could be received along the south coast of Cumbria, in parts of the Lake District, and the west coast as far as Millom.

"Radio Furness" lost its separate branding in 1991 but breakfast and afternoon opt-outs for the South Lakes and Furness continued until 1994. As a result of BBC cutbacks in the 1990s, programme opt-outs were curtailed although the Barrow studios remained staffed. The former studio in Hartington Street is now the local headquarters for the Labour Party.

Background
Radio Cumbria claims to be listened to by one-third of the county's population, despite having to face the challenge of an area that is sparsely populated and predominantly rural, with the biggest urban areas around its perimeter. Most programming has a similar format to that of other BBC local radio stations, although one unique feature is the seasonal Lamb Bank – a short daily segment which carries announcements from farmers wishing to exchange livestock.

Technical
On FM, Radio Cumbria broadcasts to northern Cumbria on 95.6 MHz (Sandale) – suitable for drivers on the M6 north of Penrith – and to the south of the county on 96.1 MHz (Morecambe Bay), with lower-powered relays on 95.2 MHz (Kendal), 104.1 MHz (Whitehaven) and 104.2 MHz (Windermere). Until 2020 the station also aired on medium wave: 756 kHz (Brisco – Carlisle) and 837 kHz (Barrow-in-Furness). It used to broadcast on 1458 kHz (Whitehaven).

The station also broadcasts via DAB, but didn't do so until 1 December 2021, which was the day that the Cumbria multiplex was switched on. Until then, BBC Radio Cumbria had been the only BBC local radio station that did not broadcast on DAB.

The station is also available on Freeview TV channel 721 and streams online via BBC Sounds.

Programming

Local programming is produced and broadcast from the BBC's Carlisle studios from 6 am – 10 pm on weekdays, 6 am – 1 am on Saturdays and Sundays.

The late show, airing from 10 pm – 1 am, originates from BBC Radio Lancashire on Monday - Thursday nights and BBC Radio Newcastle on Friday - Sunday nights.

During the station's downtime, BBC Radio Cumbria simulcasts overnight programming from BBC Radio 5 Live and BBC Radio London.

BBC Radio Cumbria Sport/BBC Sport Cumbria
The station's sport service provides exclusive commentary on Cumbria's two professional English Football League clubs, Carlisle United and Barrow, along with exclusive commentaries on the county's three semi-professional rugby league clubs, Barrow Raiders, Workington Town and Whitehaven

BBC Cumbria Sport can also be found on Twitter at BBC Sport Cumbria on Twitter and on BBC Sounds.

The station's sport department won a Radio Academy Award in 2003 for its Saturday Sport show, a Carlisle United. debate, facing competition in the Sport category from BBC World Service, Capital Gold and BBC Radio 5 Live. The judges said: The programme was firmly rooted in its community, knowledgeable of its audience and subject matter and covered the issues head-on with confidence. This debate was well produced and was skilfully presented and chaired by Paul Newton and Graham Moss. The programme developed its themes with a well-judged crescendo, creating passionate and gripping radio.

Notable former presenters
 Adrian Allen
 Richard Hammond
 Richard Madeley
 John Myers
 Helen Skelton
 Alan Smith
 Norman Thomas
 Frank Wappat
 David Lamb

See also
 CFM
 Eden FM Radio
 Heart North West
 Smooth Lake District

External links
 BBC Radio Cumbria
 BBC Cumbria Facebook page
 BBC Cumbria on Twitter
 BBC Sport Cumbria on Twitter
  History of local radio in Cumbria
 Jingles
 Barrow transmitter
 Carlisle (Brisco) transmitter
 Kendal transmitter.
 Morecambe Bay transmitter
 Sandale transmitter (including coverage map)
 Whitehaven transmitter
 Windermere transmitter

References

Radio stations established in 1973
1973 establishments in England
Cumbria
Mass media in Cumbria
Furness
Radio stations in Cumbria